Anna Beskova (born ) is a Russian female volleyball player. She was part of the Russia women's national volleyball team.

She participated in the 2004 FIVB Volleyball World Grand Prix.
On club level she played for Uralochka, RUS in 2004.

References

External links
 Profile at FIVB.org

1986 births
Living people
Russian women's volleyball players
Place of birth missing (living people)